In Greek mythology, the Laestrygonians  or Laestrygones  were a tribe of man-eating giants. They were said to have sprung from Laestrygon, son of Poseidon.

According to Thucydides (6.2.1.) and Polybius (1.2.9) the Laestrygones inhabited southeast Sicily. The name is akin to that of the Lestriconi, a branch of the Corsi people of the northeast coast of Sardinia (now Gallura).

Mythology
Odysseus, the main character of Homer's Odyssey, visited them during his journey back home to Ithaca. The giants ate many of Odysseus's men and destroyed eleven of his twelve ships by launching rocks from high cliffs. Odysseus's ship was not destroyed because it was hidden in a cove near shore. Everyone on Odysseus's ship survived the incident. "His soldiers, with a dozen ships, arrive at 'the rocky stronghold of Lamos: Telepylus, the city of the Laestrygonians'."

Lamos is not mentioned again, perhaps being understood as the founder of the city or the name of the island on which the city is situated. In this land, a man who could do without sleep could earn double wages; once as a herdsman of cattle and another as a shepherd, as they worked by night as they did by day. The ships entered a harbor surrounded by steep cliffs, with a single entrance between two headlands. The captains took their ships inside and made them fast close to one another, where it was dead calm.

Odysseus kept his own ship outside the harbor, moored to a rock. He climbed a high rock to reconnoiter, but could see nothing but some smoke rising from the ground. He sent two of his company and an attendant to investigate the inhabitants. The men followed a road and eventually met a young woman on her way to the Fountain of Artakia to fetch some water, who said she was a daughter of Antiphates or Antiphatus, the king, and directed them to his house. However, when they got there they found a gigantic woman, the wife of Antiphates who promptly called her husband, who immediately left the assembly of the people and upon arrival snatched up one of the men and killed him on the spot, presumably then eating him (as it states in the Odyssey that he only met with the men with the intention of eating them). The other two men, Eurylochus and Polites, ran away, but Antiphates raised an outcry, so that they were pursued by thousands of Laestrygonians, who are either giants or very large men and women. They threw vast rocks from the cliffs, smashing the ships, and speared the men like fish. Odysseus made his escape with his single ship because it was not trapped in the harbor; the rest of his company was lost. The surviving crew went next to Aeaea, the island of Circe.

According to historian Angelo Paratico the Laestrygonians were the result of a legend originated by the sight by Greek sailors of the Giants of Mont'e Prama, recently excavated in Sardinia.

Later Greeks believed that the Laestrygonians, as well as the Cyclopes, had once inhabited Sicily.

Gallery

Notes

Greek legendary creatures
Greek giants
Legendary tribes in Greco-Roman historiography